Book Two: Spirits is the second season of the animated TV series The Legend of Korra by Michael Dante DiMartino and Bryan Konietzko. It consists of fourteen episodes ("chapters"). It focuses more on spiritual concepts and themes than the preceding season, Book One: Air. Ordered in early 2011, Book Two: Spirits began airing on Nickelodeon in the U.S. on September 13, 2013.

Premise
In a world in which some people can telekinetically control one of the four classical elements, the Avatar is the only individual who can "bend" all four elements and is responsible for maintaining balance in the world. This season focuses on Avatar Korra coming to terms with her role as the liaison between humans and the mystical "Spirit World". 

Book Two takes place six months after Book One; its narrative is divided between Republic City (the primary setting of the first season) and other locations such as the Spirit World and the South Pole home of the Southern Water Tribe. Korra's uncle Unalaq, the chief of the Northern Water Tribe, seizes control of the Southern Water Tribe as part of a scheme to free Vaatu, an ancient dark spirit. The story follows Korra's friends' efforts to win support for the southern tribe in Republic City, and Korra's quest to foil Unalaq's plans while learning about spirits. A two-part episode entitled "Beginnings" delves into the history of the Avatar lineage. It tells the story of Wan, the young man who became the first Avatar as a result of his attempts to maintain balance between the material and spirit worlds, and to atone for empowering the dark spirit Vaatu.
 
New characters introduced in this season include Unalaq and his children Desna and Eska; Kya and Bumi, the siblings of Korra's mentor Tenzin; Varrick, an eccentric and wealthy inventor and businessman from the Southern Water Tribe.

Production

Development
In early 2011, during the production of Book One: Air – initially conceived as a standalone 12-episode miniseries – Nickelodeon decided to order fourteen additional episodes  to round out a standard 26-episode season.  As of June 2012, Book Twos writing had been completed and the episodes were in the process of being storyboarded and animated. Joshua Hamilton and Tim Hedrick, writers for Avatar: The Last Airbender, contributed to the scripts of Book Two, and the season's episodes were directed by Colin Heck and Ian Graham.

Cast

Voice actors added to the cast for Book Two: Spirits  include:
 Lisa Edelstein as Kya, Tenzin's elder sister, a waterbender, and the only daughter of Aang and Katara. 
 John Michael Higgins as Varrick, an eccentric businessman
 Adrian LaTourelle as Unalaq, Korra's paternal uncle, Tonraq's younger brother, Senna's brother-in-law, Desna and Eska's father and chief of both Water Tribes who serves as the main antagonist of Book Two along with Vaatu
 Aaron Himelstein as Desna, Korra's cousin
 Aubrey Plaza as Eska, Desna's fraternal twin sister and Korra's other cousin.
 James Remar as Tonraq, Korra's father and de facto leader of the Southern Water Tribe. Remar replaces Carlos Alazraqui, who voiced Tonraq in "Welcome to Republic City".
 Alex McKenna as Senna, Korra's mother. McKenna reprises her role from "Welcome to Republic City".
 Richard Riehle as Bumi, Tenzin's older brother, and the eldest child of Aang and Katara. He is a non-bender as he does not have any bending abilities. 
 Steven Yeun as Wan; a young man who lived ten thousand years ago, and became the first Avatar by fusing with Raava, the spirit of light.
 April Stewart as Raava, the spiritual embodiment of light and peace. After permanently fusing with Wan, she was transformed into the divine Avatar Spirit.
 Jonathan Adams as Vaatu, the main antagonist of Book Two, and the spirit of darkness and chaos.
 Stephanie Sheh as Zhu Li, Varrick's assistant.
 Greg Baldwin as Iroh, an ally of Aang from the original series, who is revealed to have lived in the Spirit World ever since his physical body's death forty years before the start of the series.
 Amy Gross as Ginger, an actress who stars in Varrick's movers who constantly rejects Bolin's advances on her.
 Spencer Garrett as Raiko, the president of Republic City who was elected following Amon's attack on Republic City in the first book.
 Héctor Elizondo as Wan Shi Tong, the owl spirit of knowledge from the previous series who believes Unalaq to be a true friend of the spirits. Elizondo reprises his role from Avatar: The Last Airbender.
 Jason Isaacs as Zhao, the former Admiral of the Fire Nation Navy that encountered Aang on multiple occasions in the first series. He encounters Aang's children in the Fog of Lost Souls, where he is forced to wander for eternity while going insane, his punishment for killing the moon spirit. Isaacs reprised his role after starring in Avatar: The Last Airbender.

Animation
After Studio Mir, which worked on the series' first season, initially declined to work on Book Two: Spirits, it was set to be completely animated by Japanese animation studio Pierrot. However, Mir's animation director Yoo Jae-myung said that because of problems with this arrangement, the series's producers asked Studio Mir to help step in and animate Book 2 as well, an offer they accepted to preserve their studio's reputation. He said that Studio Mir initially chose to focus on animating the less challenging The Boondocks rather than the second season of The Legend of Korra because of the exhaustion brought about by their work on the first season. Pierrot eventually animated episodes 1 through 6 and episode 9, while Studio Mir was responsible for episodes 7, 8, and 10 through 14.

Release

Broadcast
Book Two began broadcast on Nickelodeon in the U.S. on September 13, 2013, after a 1-year hiatus.  Airing on Fridays, it initially premiered at 7:00 PM EST but then shifted in mid-October to an 8:00 PM timeslot. Episodes 11 and 12 were shown on November 15, 2013. The Book Two Finale, episodes 13 and 14, were to be broadcast on November 22, 2013, but became available online on November 16, 2013. It was followed by Book Three: Changes, which consisted of thirteen episodes.

Marketing
Completed footage from Book Two was first made public in a June 2013 promotional video, in which Korra fights spirit creatures in an Arctic setting. The premiere episode was shown in full at The Legend of Korra panel at San Diego Comic-Con on 19 July 2013, together with the release of a trailer video for Book Two.

Episodes

Reception
Book Two, overall, received mixed-to-positive reviews from critics, with review aggregator Rotten Tomatoes calculating a 67% approval rating for the season from 9 reviews and an average rating of 8.35/10.

The premiere episode screened in advance at Comic-Con was positively reviewed by Max Nicholson of IGN, who appreciated the setup of the overarching conflict and the humorous writing. He also stated that "the animation in Book Two has taken yet another step up in quality, with noticeable advances in the action sequences and color treatment". At TV.com, Noel Kirkpatrick commented favorably on how the episode handled the necessary quantity of exposition, and on its introduction of the theme of conflict between spiritualism and secularism. Writing for Vulture, Matt Patches highlighted the loose, handheld-style cinematography – challenging for an animated series – and the "weird, wonderful", wildly imagined spirits fought by Korra; "a Kaiju parade with beasts that mirror velociraptors". The A.V. Club's Emily Guendelsberger stated that they kept up the first season's plot's "breakneck pace" and appeared intent on signaling a break with the convention of avoiding death in children's entertainment, by showing a spirit dragging a sailor to his likely death in the sea. She appreciated the nuanced portrayal of Korra's and Mako's relationship and Korra's character flaws, but remarked that Unalaq was being set up as the season's antagonist a bit too obviously.

Parts 1 and 2 of the medial episode, "Beginnings", were positively received by critics as well. Max Nicholson of IGN rated the episode 9.6/10 and praised "Beginnings" for its "stunning" animation, "top-notch" voice acting, character origins of Avatar Wan, the friendship and heartfelt relationship between Wan and Raava, "great" new insights in the Avatar universe, and as a "masterstroke in storytelling and worldbuilding." At the end of his review, he opined that "Book 2 has never looked so good.". "The Sting", which premiered before "Beginnings", was equally praised by Nicholson for the improvement of the characterizations of Mako and Asami and their chemistry between each other, in addition to establishing Varrick as a "greedy mastermind" rather than as an eccentric businessman and entertainer as he had been before. For "The Guide", Nicholson praised the character growths of Tenzin and the fleshed-out characterization of Jinora. He lauded the episode "A New Spiritual Age" for a "great character narrative" for Korra and the establishment of Unalaq as a more of a corrupt, twisted, and menacing villain. He was also surprised to see the return of Iroh of Avatar: The Last Airbender; this time, to help Korra with her journey in the spirit world. Parts 1 and 2 of "Civil Wars" were equally acclaimed by Nicholson for the friendship between Bolin and Varrick, the sibling dynamic of Tenzin, Kya, and Bumi, a "strong, complex conflict" for Korra, the respective relationship of Tenzin, Kya, and Bumi, and Korra, Tonraq, and Senna as the heart of the story, and the twist behind Tonraq's banishment from the Northern Water Tribe and his imprisonment. According to him, "Night of a Thousand Stars" brought out the best of Bolin and the worst of Varrick, as well as setting up the conflict for the last three episodes of Book 2. For "Harmonic Convergence", Nicholson praised its spectacular action sequences, fleshing out more on Unalaq's intriguing evil purpose, the heroism of Bumi, and the animation.

References

External links 

 
 

The Legend of Korra
2013 American television seasons